The Innocent is a 1979 play by Scottish playwright Tom McGrath. It was first performed by the Royal Shakespeare Company at the Warehouse Theatre in London, opening on 24 May 1979. The production was directed by Howard Davies and starred Ian Charleson.

The play is autobiographical, and concerns McGrath's psychedelic drug and heroin use in the counter-culture 1960s as an underground poet, writer, and musician. The protagonist Joe Maguire is an idealistic intellectual and existentialist, a jazz-playing underground newspaper editor, who is drawn into heroin use and becomes a junkie.

Original cast
Joe Maguire ... Ian Charleson
Suzie ...  Ruby Wax
Rick ... David Lyon
Heggie ... Hilton McRae
Heggie's Maw ... Eve Pearce
Malachie ... Anthony Higgins 
Andy ... David Bradley
Jay ... Paul Moriarty 
Brenda ... Sheridan Fitzgerald  
Kate ... Avril Carson 
Pie Mackay ... Mark Windsor  
Sonny ... Alan Cody 
Dr. Smith ... Darlene Johnson

Notes

External links
McGrath obituary – The Guardian
McGrath obituary – The Independent

1979 plays
British plays
Plays based on actual events
Autobiographical plays